Podofomes is a genus of polypore fungi in the family Polyporaceae. The genus, which was circumscribed in Zdeněk Pouzar in 1966, contains three species.

References

Polyporaceae
Polyporales genera
Taxa described in 1966